Annabelle Codey (born 3 February 1997) is an Australian rugby union player. She plays for the Queensland Reds in the Super W competition.

Codey was named in Australia's squad for the 2022 Pacific Four Series in New Zealand. She made her international debut for the Wallaroos against New Zealand on 12 June at Tauranga.

References 

1997 births
Living people
Australia women's international rugby union players
Australian female rugby union players
21st-century Australian women
20th-century Australian women